Snip (1736 – 8 May 1757) was a British Thoroughbred racehorse. He only won one race, but later became a successful sire. His son Snap was undefeated in his four races and became a multiple-time Champion sire. Snip was bred and owned by William Cavendish, 3rd Duke of Devonshire.

Background
Snip was a brown colt bred by the 3rd Duke of Devonshire and foaled in 1736. He was sired by the undefeated racehorse and Champion sire Flying Childers, who also sired Blaze. Snip's dam was a daughter of Basto.

Racing career
Snip's first race was in 1741 at Beccles in Suffolk, where he beat Thirkleby, Fancy and three others in a £50 race of two heats. He later raced at Newmarket, but was unsuccessful.

Stud career
Despite his race record he apparently appealed to breeders due to his good conformation. He stood as a stallion at Kenton in Northumberland. He sired the undefeated Snap, who later became Champion sire four times. He also sired Prince T'Quassaw, Judgement, Fribble, Swiss and Havannah. Snip died on 8 May 1757 and was replaced at Kenton by his son Snap. Snap was the sire of Goldfiner, Juniper and Latham's Snap. He was also the damsire of Sir Peter Teazle.

Pedigree

Note: b. = Bay, br. = Brown, ch. = Chestnut

* Snip was inbred 4 × 4 to Leedes Arabian. This means that the stallion appears twice in the fourth generation of his pedigree.

References

1736 racehorse births
1757 racehorse deaths
Racehorses bred in the Kingdom of Great Britain
Racehorses trained in the Kingdom of Great Britain
Thoroughbred family 9-a
Individual male horses